Allan Wilho "Al" Fiskar (April 4, 1928 – December 16, 2013) was a Canadian curler and coach from Thunder Bay, Ontario.

Teams

Record as a coach of national teams

Personal life 
Fiskar grew up in Kaministiquia and Fort William (now Thunder Bay), and was the son of Emil and Mary Fiskar. He attended Selkirk High School. He worked as a journeyman electrician. He was married to Marion and had three children.

References

External links
 
 

1928 births
2013 deaths
Canadian male curlers
World curling champions
Curlers from Thunder Bay
Canadian curling coaches
Canadian people of Finnish descent
20th-century Canadian people